Good Things is the second studio album by American musician Aloe Blacc. The album was released on September 28, 2010 in the US and 26 November 2010 in the UK by Stones Throw Records.

Singles
The first single from the album, "I Need a Dollar" (produced by Truth & Soul), was released on March 16, 2010. It peaked No. 2 in the UK and Ireland. In Switzerland and Austria it peaked at No. 5, No. 1 in Belgium (Flanders). An edited version of the song serves as the theme song for the HBO series How to Make It in America.

The second single, "Loving You Is Killing Me", was released on March 7, 2011. It peaked No. 8 in Austria, No. 12 in Austria and Belgium (Flanders) and No. 26 in Switzerland.

"Green Lights" was released as the second single in UK (third overall) on September 9, 2011.

Track listing

Charts

Weekly charts

Year-end charts

References

2010 albums
Aloe Blacc albums
Stones Throw Records albums
Vertigo Records albums